Japanese silk is silk harvested in Japan.  Archaeological evidence indicates that sericulture has been practiced since the Yayoi period. The silk industry was dominant from the 1930s to 1950s, but is less common now.

History
Silk from East Asia had declined in importance after  silkworms were smuggled from China to the Byzantine Empire.  However, in 1845, an epidemic of flacherie among European silkworms devastated the silk industry there.  This led to a demand for silk from China and Japan, where as late as the nineteenth and early twentieth centuries, Japanese exports competed directly with Chinese in the international market in such low value-added, labor-intensive products as raw silk.

Between  1850 and 1930, raw silk ranked as the leading export for both countries, accounting for 20%–40% of Japan’s total exports and 20%–30% of China’s.  Between the 1890s and the 1930s, Japanese silk exports quadrupled, making Japan the largest silk exporter in the world.  This increase in exports was mostly due to the economic reforms during the Meiji period and the decline of the Qing dynasty in China, which led to rapid industrialization of Japan whilst the Chinese industries stagnated.

During World War II, embargoes against Japan had led to adoption of synthetic materials such as Nylon, which led to the decline of the Japanese silk industry and its position as the lead silk exporter of the world. Today, China exports the largest volume of raw silk in the world.

See also
Antheraea yamamai, wild silk moth species in Japan

References

External links

Silk
Silk